United States Youth records in athletics are the best marks set in an event by an American athlete who will not reach their 18th birthday in the given year of competition.  USATF, the United States governing body, does not keep records for the youth division.  This list is compiled from IAAF lists and corresponds to IAAF definitions of the age division.  USATF keeps youth division records here, but the age divisions do not correspond with IAAF divisions.  A youth could be in the USATF 17-18 year division, but not qualify under the IAAF definition.  Additionally, USATF rules limit eligibility for youth records to youth competitions, while IAAF accepts any performance by a qualified athlete in a properly conducted meet.  Track and Field News also keeps records and in many cases their records do not agree with USATF.

Outdoor

Key:
 

h = hand timing

A = affected by altitude

Boys

Girls

Indoor

Boys

Girls

References 
General
USATF American youth records – Outdoor 19 December 2018 updated
T&FN American youth records – Boys Outdoor 11 July 2021 updated
T&FN American youth records – Girls Outdoor 28 March 2022 updated
Specific

United States youth
Youth records
Track and field, youth